Falcatelodes is a monotypic genus of moths of the family Apatelodidae. It was erected by Max Wilhelm Karl Draudt in 1929, and contains a single species, Falcatelodes anava, which was first described by Herbert Druce in 1890 (as Apatelodes anava). 

Falcatelodes anava is found in Ecuador.

References

 

Apatelodidae
Monotypic moth genera